Bajagić is a village in Sinj municipality, Split-Dalmatia County, Croatia. Population is 562 (2011).

The local parish was established in 1780, after the end of the Ottoman rule. The parish church of St. Nicholas with an adjacent early medieval cemetery is located in the village.

References

Populated places in Split-Dalmatia County